The John Lair House near Shawhan, Kentucky was listed on the National Register of Historic Places in 1983.  The listing included three contributing buildings.

It is a three-bay two-story hall-parlor plan dry stone house.

See also
John Lair House and Stables, Renfro Valley, Kentucky, also NRHP-listed

References

National Register of Historic Places in Harrison County, Kentucky
Federal architecture in Kentucky
Greek Revival architecture in Kentucky
Hall and parlor houses
Houses in Harrison County, Kentucky